Helliconia Spring is a novel by Brian W. Aldiss published in 1982, set in a world with two suns and where each year is incredibly long.

Dave Pringle reviewed Helliconia Spring for Imagine magazine, and stated that "it seems the hour of the blockbuster has arrived and there is little we can do but submit".

Reviews
Review by Faren Miller (1982) in Locus, #253 February 1982
Review by Fritz R. Leiber (1982) in Interzone, #2 Summer 1982
Review by Roger C. Schlobin (1982) in Fantasy Newsletter, #48 June 1982
Review by Mary Gentle (1982) in Vector 109
Review by Darrell Schweitzer (1982) in Science Fiction Review, Fall 1982
Review by Baird Searles (1982) in Isaac Asimov's Science Fiction Magazine, September 1982
Review by Tom Easton (1982) in Analog Science Fiction/Science Fact, November 1982
Review by John Clute (1983) in Omni, March 1983
Review by Don D'Ammassa (1984) in Science Fiction Chronicle, January 1984

References

1982 novels